Wang Ching-rui (born 16 February 1922) is a Taiwanese former sports shooter. He competed in the trap event at the 1960 Summer Olympics.

References

External links
 

1922 births
Possibly living people
Taiwanese male sport shooters
Olympic shooters of Taiwan
Shooters at the 1960 Summer Olympics
People from Changhua County
20th-century Taiwanese people